The 3,000-hit club is the group of 33 batters who have collected 3,000 or more regular-season hits in their careers in Major League Baseball (MLB), achieving a milestone "long considered the greatest measure of superior bat handling" and often described as a guarantee of eventual entry into the Baseball Hall of Fame. 

Cap Anson was the first to do so, although his precise career hit total is unclear; he is the oldest player to have achieved the mark, having done so at the age of 45. Two players—Nap Lajoie and Honus Wagner—reached 3,000 hits during the 1914 season. Ty Cobb did so in 1921 and became the first player in MLB history to reach 4,000 hits in 1927, ultimately finishing his career with 4,189. Pete Rose, the current hit leader, became the second player to reach 4,000 hits on April 13, 1984, and surpassed Cobb in September 1985, finishing his career with 4,256. Roberto Clemente's career ended with precisely 3,000 hits, which he reached in the last at bat of his career on September 30, 1972.

Of the 33 members, 18 were right-handed batters, 13 were left-handed, and two were switch hitters. The Cleveland Guardians and Detroit Tigers are the only franchises to see three players reach 3,000 hits while on their roster: for Cleveland, Lajoie, while the team was the Naps, Tris Speaker, and most recently Eddie Murray, and, for the Tigers, Cobb, Al Kaline, and more recently Miguel Cabrera. Every position except catcher and pitcher has at least one player with 3,000 hits. Ten of these players have played for only one major league team. Seven players—Hank Aaron, Willie Mays, Eddie Murray, Rafael Palmeiro, Albert Pujols, Alex Rodriguez, and Miguel Cabrera—are also members of the 500 home run club. Cobb holds the highest career batting average at .366, while Cal Ripken Jr. holds the lowest at .276. Derek Jeter, Wade Boggs, and Alex Rodriguez are the only players to hit a home run for their 3,000th hit, and Paul Molitor and Ichiro Suzuki are the only players to hit a triple for their 3,000th; all others hit a single or double. Stan Musial was the first to collect an extra-base hit for his 3,000th hit, and is also the only one to have done so as pinch-hitter. Craig Biggio is the only player to be thrown out for his 3,000th hit, while attempting to stretch the hit into a double. Biggio and Jeter are the only players whose 3,000th hit came in a game where they had five hits; Jeter reached base safely in all of his at bats. The most recent player to reach 3,000 hits is Cabrera, who did so on April 23, 2022, while playing for the Detroit Tigers; he is also the only active player with more than 3,000 hits.

All eligible players with 3,000 or more career hits have been elected to the Hall except Palmeiro and Rodriguez, whose careers have been tainted by steroid allegations, and since 1962 all except Biggio were elected on the first ballot. Rose is ineligible for the Hall of Fame because he was permanently banned from baseball in 1989. After four years on the ballot, Palmeiro failed to be named on 5% of ballots in 2014, after which his name was removed from the Baseball Writers' Association of America ballots, although it is possible that the Veterans Committee could select him. Rodriguez garnered 34.3% of the vote during his first year of eligibility in 2022. Twenty-one different teams have had a player reach 3,000 hits.

Key

Members
Statistics are updated through the 2022 season.

See also

List of lifetime Major League Baseball hit leaders through history
List of Major League Baseball hit records
List of Major League Baseball career hits leaders
Mr. 3000
Chasing 3000
500 home run club

Notes

References
General

Specific

Major League Baseball statistics
Hits 3000